Asheqan-e Musa (also Romanized as ‘Āsheqān-e Mūsá; also known as ‘Āsheqān-e Mūsá Beyg) is a village in Howmeh-ye Shomali Rural District, in the Central District of Eslamabad-e Gharb County, Kermanshah Province, Iran. At the 2006 census, its population was 197, in 39 families.

References 

Populated places in Eslamabad-e Gharb County